The city of Saskatoon, Saskatchewan, Canada currently has 65 neighbourhoods divided amongst 9 designated Suburban Development Areas (SDAs). Some neighbourhoods underwent boundary and name changes in the 1990s when the City of Saskatoon adjusted its community map.

Definitions

 Neighbourhood: the basic unit of residential development, comprehensively planned and maintained over the long term. Many older neighbourhoods were defined by elementary school catchment areas. The boundaries of some neighbourhoods were adjusted when the school boards no longer required students to live in their school catchment area.  The boundaries of neighbourhoods are now defined by "natural" barriers such as major streets, railways, and bodies of water.
 Suburban Development Area (SDA): a collection of neighbourhoods organized to facilitate long range planning for infrastructure and related community facilities. Each SDA has approximately ten neighbourhoods, 50,000 people, district and multi-district parks, a mixed-use suburban centre, and high schools.
 Suburban Centre (SC): a neighbourhood that is the primary mixed-use focal point for a suburban development area. They are designed to provide commercial, institutional and recreational lands serving the basic needs of the SDA. Medium to high density residential development is encouraged within SCs and the ones within Saskatoon each include at least one major enclosed or "strip mall" shopping centre.
 Management Area (MA): a term used to classify areas that are generally not covered by residential, industrial or future development characteristics. The main campus of the University of Saskatchewan and surrounding lands is an example.
 Development Area: an area within the city limits that is designated for future neighbourhood development. The term is also applied to remnant land that at the present time is not earmarked for any notable development.

East

Core Neighbourhood SDA
 Nutana
 Varsity View

Holmwood SDA
 Brighton
 U of S Lands - East Management Area
 The City of Saskatoon Project Growth Concept Plan dated June 28, 2012 sketches out 4 additional residential communities, a mixed-use suburban centre, and a business park/industrial area in this region.

Lakewood SDA
 Briarwood
 College Park
 College Park East
 Hillcrest Management Area
 Lakeridge
 Lakewood Suburban Centre
 Lakeview
 Rosewood
 Wildwood

Nutana SDA
 Adelaide/Churchill
 Avalon
 Brevoort Park
 Buena Vista
 C.N. Industrial
 Diefenbaker Management Area
 Eastview
 Exhibition
 Greystone Heights
 Grosvenor Park
 Haultain
 Holliston
 Nutana Park
 Nutana Suburban Centre
 Queen Elizabeth
 South Development Area
 Stonebridge
 The Willows

University Heights SDA
 Arbor Creek
 Aspen Ridge
 Erindale
 Evergreen
 Forest Grove
 Silverspring
 Sutherland
 Sutherland Industrial
 University Heights Suburban Centre
 Willowgrove
 University of Saskatchewan Management Area
 U of S Lands South Management Area
 U of S Lands North Management Area
 University Heights Development Area
 Two future neighbourhoods are planned

West

Blairmore SDA
 Blairmore Suburban Centre
 Elk Point
 Kensington
 Blairmore Development Area
 Six additional future neighbourhoods are planned

Confederation SDA
 AgPro Industrial
 Confederation Park
 Confederation Suburban Centre
 Dundonald
 Fairhaven
 Hampton Village
 Holiday Park
 Hudson Bay Park
 Massey Place
 Meadowgreen
 Montgomery Place
 Mount Royal
 Pacific Heights
 Parkridge
 South West Industrial
 West Industrial
 Westview
 CN Yards Management Area
 Gordie Howe Management Area
 SaskPower Management Area

Core Neighbourhood SDA
 Caswell Hill
 City Park
 Downtown
 King George
 Pleasant Hill
 Riversdale
 Westmount

Lawson SDA
 Central Industrial
 Kelsey-Woodlawn
 Lawson Heights
 Lawson Heights Suburban Centre
 Mayfair
 North Park
 Richmond Heights
 River Heights
 Silverwood Heights

North Industrial SDA
 Agriplace
 Airport Business Area
 Hudson Bay Industrial
 Marquis Industrial
 North Industrial
 Airport Management Area
 Riel Industrial

References

External links

 City of Saskatoon – Community Services – Planning & Development Branch
 Neighbourhood Profiles 2012

Saskatoon
neighbourhoods in Saskatoon